This article lists political parties in Togo. 
Togo is a one party dominant state with the Union for the Republic in power. Opposition parties are allowed, but are widely considered to have no real chance of gaining power.

Active parties

Parties represented in the National Assembly

Other parties 

Save Togo Collective (Sauvons le Togo)
Alliance of Democrats for Integral Development (Alliance des Démocrates pour le Développement Intégral)
National Alliance for Change (Alliance Nationale pour le Changement)
Organisation to Build a United Togo (Organisation pour bâtir dans l’union un Togo solidaire)
Socialist Pact for Renewal (Pacte Socialiste pour le Renouveau)
Workers' Party (Parti des travailleurs)
Rainbow Alliance (Coalition Arc-en-Ciel)
Action Committee for Renewal (Comité d'Action pour la Renouveau)
Democratic Convention of African Peoples (Convention démocratique des peuples africains)
Union of Socialist Democrats of Togo (Union des Démocrates Socialistes du Togo)
Citizens' Movement for Democracy and Development (Mouvement Citoyen pour la Démocratie et le Développement)
New Togolese Commitment (Nouvel Engagement Togolais)
Democratic Convention of African Peoples (Convention Démocratique des Peoples Africains)
Rally for the Support of Democracy and Development (Rassemblement pour le soutien de la démocratie et du développement)
Union for Democracy and Social Progress (Union pour la démocratie et le progrès social)
Juvento
Believers' Movement for Equality and Peace (Mouvement des croyants pour l'égalité et la paix)
Patriotic Pan-African Convergence (Convergence patriotique panafricaine)
Party for Renewal and Redemption (Parti pour le Renouveau et la Rédemption)
Party for Democracy and Renewal (Parti pour la Démocratie et le Renouveau)
Democratic Alliance for the Fatherland (Alliance Démocratique pour la Patrie)
The Nest (Le Nid)
Popular Union for the Republic (Union Populaire pour la République)
Togolese Alliance of Democrats (Alliance Togolaise des Démocrates)
New Popular Dynamic (Nouvelle Dynamique Populaire)
Coordination of New Forces (Coordination des Forces Nouvelles)
Regrouping of the Live Forces of Youth for Change (Regroupement des Forces Vives de la Jeunesse pour le Changement)
Party of Action for Change in Togo (Parti d’Action pour le Changement au Togo)
Party of the Union for Renovation and Development (Parti d'Union pour la Rénovation et le Développement)
Communist Party of Togo (Parti Comuniste du Togo)

Defunct parties
Rally for the Togolese People (Rassemblement du Peuple Togolais)
Democratic Front for the Liberation of Togo (Front Démocratique pour la Libération du Togo)
Democratic Union of the Togolese People (Union Démocratique des Populations Togolaises)
Socialist Revolution Party of Benin (Parti de la Révolution Socialiste du Bénin)
Togolese Party of Progress (Parti togolais du progrès)
Togolese People's Movement (Mouvement Popularie Togolais)
Togolese Union for Democracy (Union togolaise pour la démocratie)
Union for Justice and Democracy (Union pour la Justice et la Démocratie)
Union of Chiefs and Peoples of the North (Union des Chefs et des Populations du Nord)

See also
 Politics of Togo
 List of political parties by country

Togo
 
Parties
Togo
Political parties

fr:Politique au Togo#Partis politiques